Elżbieta Adamiak (born 7 October 1964) is a Polish Roman Catholic theologian. Since 2016, she has been Professor of Fundamental Theology and Dogmatics at the Institute for Catholic Theology at the University of Koblenz-Landau.

References

1964 births
Polish Roman Catholics
Polish feminists
Living people
Place of birth missing (living people)
Christian feminist theologians
Polish Roman Catholic theologians
Women Christian theologians
Academic staff of the University of Koblenz and Landau